The water bodies of Azerbaijan were formed over a long geological timeframe and changed significantly throughout that period. This is particularly evidenced by remnants of ancient rivers found throughout the country. The country's water systems are continually changing under the influence of natural forces and human introduced industrial activities. Artificial rivers (canals) and ponds are a part of Azerbaijan's water systems.

The hydrography of Azerbaijan basically belongs to the Caspian Sea basin.

Rivers

Rivers form the principal part of the water systems of Azerbaijan. There are 8,359 rivers of various lengths within Azerbaijan.

The largest rivers that flow through the country are:
 Kür, main water source and the artery of the country
 Araz 
 Qanıx, located in Alazan 
 Qabırlı, also known as Iori 
 Khrami
 Samur
 Pirsaatçay 
 Bolgar-Chay, located in Jalilabad District
 Ağstafa 
 Hekeriychay, also known as Hekeri
 Kurekchay
 Tərtərçay
 Ağdabançay
 Levçay
 Turağayçay
 Türyançay 
 Vilesh
 Qarqarçay

River system
The rivers in Azerbaijan can be divided into three groups:
The Kur basin rivers (Qanix, Qabirri, Turyan, Agstafa, Shekir, Terter, Khachin, etc.)
The Araz basin rivers (Arpachay, Nakhchivan, Okhchu, Hekeri, Kondelenchay, etc.)
Rivers, flowing directly into the Caspian Sea (Samur, Gudyal, Velvele, Vilesh, Lenkeran, etc.)

Azerbaijan river systems are changing and evolving under the influence of various physiographic factors: climate, landscape, geological structure, soil and vegetation. 
The density of the river network increases, then gradually decreases later with higher altitudes. Except for the Talysh region (1.6-2.2 km/km²), the river system density is the highest (1–2 km/km²) at 1,000-2,500 kilometers, while in the area of the Talysh mountains it peaks at 1.6-2.2 km/km² at 500–1,000 km. The average density of the river system of Azerbaijan is 0.39 km/km². The density is even lower than 0.05 km/km² in the plains.

Kura and Aras

The Kur and Aras are the longest rivers in Azerbaijan. They run through the Kur-Araz Lowland. The rivers that directly flow into the Caspian Sea, originate mainly from the north-eastern slope of the Greater Caucasus and Talysh Mountains and run along the Samur-Devechi and Lenkeran lowlands.

The Kura River basin area (86,000 km²) up to the junction with the Aras River is smaller than the Aras water basin (101,937 km²). The river is still called Kura on the junction because the water level of the Kura is twice as high as that of the Aras River.

Lakes

 Ağgöl
 Ajinohur
 Alagöl
 Boyukshor 
 Göygöl 
 Hajikabul
 Jandari
 Maral-gol  
 Masazirgol
 Sarysu, the largest lake by area and volume

Reservoirs

Over 60 water reservoirs have been constructed in order to regulate the river flow in Azerbaijan. The formation of these reservoirs is one of the measures that has been undertaken in order to ration the utilization of water and energy resources.

The largest water reservoirs are:
 Agstafachay
 Araz 
 Jeyranbatan  
 Khanbulanchay 
 Khudaferin 
 Mingachevir, the largest reservoir by area
 Sarsang
 Shamkir
 Varvara 
 Vileshchay 
 Yenikend

The reservoirs in Azerbaijan are designed to be utilized for various purposes, while most other ponds are used exclusively for irrigation.

See also
 Environment of Azerbaijan

References

External links

 Scientific-Research Institute for Hydrometeorology

 
Azerbaijan
Bodies Of Water